UA4 experiment (COULOMB) was a high-energy physics experiment at the Proton-Antiproton Collider at CERN. The UA4 collaboration consisted of physicists from Amsterdam, Genova, Napoli, Pisa, Roma, California and CERN. UA4 was approved on 18 January 1979, and the first phase of data taking lasted until 17 June 1985. The spokesperson of UA4 was Giorgi Matthiae.

UA4 was followed by UA4/2, a collaboration between Genova, Roma, Paris, Prague, Valencia and CERN. The purpose of UA4/2 was to measure the ratio of real to the imaginary part of the forward elastic scattering amplitude. It was approved in July 1990, and recorded data throughout 1991.

The objective of the UA4 experiment was to measure the antiproton-proton cross-section, in order to show that cross-sections rising with energy are a characteristic of strong interaction. One had previously measured proton-antiproton cross-sections at the Intersecting Storage Rings, but as the Proton-Antiproton Collider — a modification of the Super Proton Synchrotron — began operating, the measurements could be done in a new energy range: up to 540 GeV center-of-mass energy.

Elastic events were detected by high resolution wire chambers and scintillation-counter hodoscopes. A system of drift chamber telescopes and counter telescopes were placed on the left and the right side of the crossing region to detect inelastic events.

After the period of data taking, the UA4 collaboration could conclude that proton-antiproton cross-section indeed rises with energy.

See also
List of Super Proton Synchrotron experiments
UA1 experiment
UA2 experiment

References

External links
List of publications from the UA4 and UA4/2 Collaboration
CERN-UA-004 experiment record on INSPIRE-HEP

Particle experiments
CERN experiments